Yug may refer to:

Yug (river), a river in the European part of Russia
Yugh people, an indigenous group from central Siberia
Yug language (Yugh)
Yuga, a period of time in Hinduism
Yug (TV series), an Indian television series
Yugoslavia, a former sovereign state in Europe
Azerbaijan State Theatre "Yuğ"

Language and nationality disambiguation pages